The Kaw River Railroad  is a Kansas City, Missouri railroad, established in June 2004. Twelve miles of original track served the Kansas City Southern Railroad customers in Kansas City and Union Station. The original KAW was a Kansas City Southern Railway Company property and was the first shortline Watco began operating for KCS, serving customers in the Greater Kansas City area and handling interchanges among the BNSF, KCS, and Union Pacific. The April 2005 expansion was a BNSF property serving customers in Clay County, Missouri, and interchanges with the BNSF at Birmingham, Missouri. The KCTL interchanges with all the Class I railroads serving Kansas City.

The KAW operations office is located in Kansas City, Kansas; Customer Service is located in both Pittsburg and Kansas City, Kansas.

Collectively, the KAW and KCTL handle approximately 15,000 carloads of animal byproducts, chemicals, plastics and industrial products annually.  The KAW also has a transload site available for handling dry bulk products and other carload traffic.

Additions and expansions 
The Kaw expanded from its original form in April 2005 by adding 16 miles of track from Birmingham, Missouri to Kearney, Missouri. In March 2006 the KAW took up operations for the Kansas City Terminal Railway (KCTL), adding more than 30 customers. In May 2007, nearly 15 miles of industrial track were added to serve customers of the Bedford Yard.

References 

2004 establishments in Missouri
Kansas railroads
Missouri railroads
Railway companies established in 2004
Watco